Michael Shane Hollis (born May 22, 1972) is most recently an American football placekicker who is a free agent. He formerly played in the National Football League (NFL) from 1994-2003, leading the NFL in scoring (1997 season) and becoming the Most Accurate Kicker in NFL History during that time. He signed with the Sharks in 2022 after almost 20 years of retirement. He then played for the Buffalo Bills and New York Giants before initially retiring after an injury in 2003.

Early years
Born in Kellogg, Idaho, Hollis grew up in eastern Washington in the Spokane area and graduated from Central Valley High School in 1990. He kicked for the University of Idaho in 1992 and 1993, after two seasons at Wenatchee Valley College.

NFL
Hollis was signed as an undrafted free agent by the expansion Jacksonville Jaguars in the team's inaugural 1995 season.  He played for the Jaguars for seven seasons, setting a number of the new club's kicking records. He was released following the 2001 season and was picked up by the Buffalo Bills, for whom he played for one season in 2002. He was signed by the New York Giants in 2003, but missed the 2003 season after being placed on injured reserve after hurting his back, a problem he battled for several seasons. He never recovered from the injury and failed his physical in March 2004, ending his NFL career.

NAL and later years
After being retired from the NFL for almost 20 years, Hollis joined the Jacksonville Sharks in the NAL in 2022. Since his retirement from the NFL, Hollis has been staying in shape through his ProForm Kicking Academy where he teaches a very unique form of kicking and punting. On June 6, 2022, Hollis was released by the Sharks.

References

External links
 Vandal Athletics Hall of Fame - Mike Hollis
Mike Hollis' ProForm Kicking Academy
 Pro Player Connect Profile
Video Interview With Placekicker Mike Hollis 2011- Miller on Sports Radio

American Conference Pro Bowl players
American football placekickers
Idaho Vandals football players
Jacksonville Jaguars players
Buffalo Bills players
New York Giants players
People from Kellogg, Idaho
Players of American football from Idaho
Players of American football from Spokane, Washington
1972 births
Living people